Matalebreras is a municipality located in the province of Soria, Castile and León, Spain. In 2019, (INE) the municipality had a total population of 66 inhabitants.

The municipality is made up of the localities of Matalebreras and Montenegro de Ágreda.

References 

Municipalities in the Province of Soria